The Church of Jesus Christ of Latter-day Saints in Benin refers to the Church of Jesus Christ of Latter-day Saints (LDS Church) and its members in Benin.   In January 2009, there were 253 members in Benin.  In December 2021, there were 4,765 members in 19 congregations.

History

In 1998, a small group of Beninese met in the home of Lincoln Dahl, a Latter-day Saint working in the American embassy in Cotonou. The first citizen of Benin to be Baptized was Claude P. Toze who was baptized on October 4, 1998. The first missionary couple assigned to live in Benin full time were Verne and Kathleen Davis, who arrived On January 23, 2001.
The BYU Singers toured Benin in May 2001 and later donated their blue ties and dresses to be warn when legal recognition came.
The Church obtained legal recognition in Benin on March 7, 2003. The first younger missionaries arrived the next month.

In 2005, the first branch was organized in Cotonou. By 2008, 3 branches had been organized. In 2012 a district was created in Cotonou, and on April 24, 2016, the Cotonou Stake was organized.

Stakes and Congregations
As of February 2023, the following congregations were located in Benin:

Cococodji Benin Stake
Agla Ward
Aibatin Ward
Cococodji Ward
Cocotomey Ward
Fidjrosse Ward
Gbegame Branch
Hevie Ward
Hilacondji Branch

Cotonou Benin Stake
Akpakpa Ward
Arconville Ward
Avotrou Ward
Calavi Ward
Finagnon Ward
Gbedjromede Ward
Jericho Ward
Menontin Ward
Porto Novo Branch

Other Congregations

The following Congregations are not part of a stake or district.
Benin Cotonou Mission Branch
Bohicon Branch
The Benin Cotonou Mission Branch serves individuals and families not in proximity to a meetinghouse. All congregations not part of a stake are classified as branches, regardless of size.

Missions
Benin was assigned to the Ivory Coast Mission in 1999. Shortly after, the Ivory Coast Mission was renamed the Ivory Coast Abidjan Mission to meet the church's mission naming guidelines. The Ghana Cape Coast Mission was organized on 1 July 2005 which Benin was a part of. On July 1, 2011, the Benin Cotonou Mission was created. As of May 2021, the mission covers the countries of Benin and Togo.

Temples
As of May 2021, Benin is part of the Accra Ghana Temple District.

See also
Religion in Benin

References

External links
 The Church of Jesus Christ of Latter-day Saints (Africa West Area) 
 ComeUntoChrist.org Latter-day Saints Visitor site

 Benin